Symphytum asperum is a flowering plant of the genus Symphytum in the family Boraginaceae. Common names include rough comfrey and prickly comfrey. It is native to Asia and it is known in Europe and North America as an introduced species and sometimes a weed.

References

External links
Jepson Manual Treatment
 University of California, Berkeley Photo Gallery

asperum
Taxa named by Ivan Lepyokhin